Gmina Jerzmanowa is a rural gmina (administrative district) in Głogów County, Lower Silesian Voivodeship, in south-western Poland.

Neighbouring gminas
Gmina Jerzmanowa is bordered by the gminas of Głogów, Grębocice, Polkowice, Radwanice and Żukowice.

Villages
The gmina contains the villages of Bądzów, Gaiki, Jaczów, Jerzmanowa, Kurów Mały, Kurowice, Łagoszów Mały, Maniów, Modła, Potoczek and Smardzów.

References

Jerzmanowa
Głogów County